Zdravko Rajkov (5 December 1927 – 30 July 2006) was a Serbian football striker and manager.

On the national level he played for Yugoslavia national team scoring 11 goals in 28 matches, and participated in the 1958 FIFA World Cup, where he scored a goal in the match against Paraguay. He was also part of Yugoslavia's squad at the 1952 Summer Olympics, but he did not play in any matches. He later began coaching career and coached several teams, including Iran national team and Algeria national team.

Honours

Clubs
FK Vojvodina Novi Sad
Yugoslav First League: Runner-up 1957, 1962
Yugoslav Cup: Runner-up 1951

FC Lausanne-Sport
Nationalliga A: Runner-up 1963

Esteghlal FC
Iran League: 1971, 1975 ; Runner-up 1974 (as a manager)
Asian Champion Club Tournament: 1970 ; Third place: 1971 (as a manager)

International
Summer Olympics: Silver medal 1952
Africa Cup of Nations: Runner-up 1980 (as a manager)

References

External links

 
 Player profile on Serbian National Team page
 

1927 births
2006 deaths
People from Žabalj
Serbian footballers
Yugoslav footballers
FK Vojvodina players
FC Biel-Bienne players
Yugoslav First League players
Yugoslav expatriate footballers
Yugoslav expatriate sportspeople in Switzerland
Yugoslav expatriate sportspeople in Spain
Expatriate footballers in Spain
Expatriate footballers in Switzerland
Yugoslavia international footballers
1958 FIFA World Cup players
Footballers at the 1952 Summer Olympics
Olympic footballers of Yugoslavia
Olympic silver medalists for Yugoslavia
Olympic medalists in football
Yugoslav football managers
Serbian football managers
Serbian emigrants to Canada
Esteghlal F.C. managers
FK Vojvodina managers
Sepahan S.C. managers
Córdoba CF managers
Iran national football team managers
Expatriate football managers in Iran
Algeria national football team managers
Expatriate football managers in Algeria
Yugoslav expatriate sportspeople in Algeria
Yugoslav expatriate sportspeople in Iran
Medalists at the 1952 Summer Olympics
1980 African Cup of Nations managers
Association football forwards